Veritas International University (VIU) is a non-profit Christian university located in Santa Ana, California. Founded in 2008, the university began as a seminary before transitioning to a university with the addition of undergraduate and post-graduate degrees. The university now offers doctoral degrees as well.

History 
Veritas International University was established by Norman Geisler and Pastor Joseph Holden in 2008 as Veritas Evangelical Seminary in Santa Ana, California. The founders envisioned a school which would become like Southern Evangelical Seminary for the western U.S.  Beginning with the objective to train Christian leaders specializing in classical Christian apologetics, the seminary expanded its programs to include various degree offerings, including archaeology, Biblical History, Education, and Theology. The name change to Veritas International University was approved in late 2017, and implemented in January 2018.

Veritas International University was accredited in 2014 by the Transnational Association of Christian Colleges and Schools (TRACS), and is recognized by the United States Department of Education.

Academics 
Veritas International University has nine-degree programs, held within three schools:  Veritas College & Seminary, VIU School of Archaeology, and the VIU Norman L. Geisler School of Apologetics. Each school is part of the university, emphasizing their respective areas of study that includes Christian studies, biblical studies, theological studies, Near Eastern archaeology and biblical history, apologetics, and pastoral studies.

The Best Schools and Colleges ranked Veritas International University's graduate program in Christian apologetics as the sixth best in the United States.

Doctrinal stance
Veritas International University has an evangelical doctrinal statement that emphasizes "three legs" of biblical authority:  inspiration, infallibility, and biblical inerrancy. In addition to its approach to biblical studies, Veritas maintains a focus on classical theology, apologetics, and Thomistic philosophy.

Campus 
Veritas International University's main campus is in Santa Ana, California with a satellite teaching site in Albuquerque, New Mexico.

Notable Current and Former Faculty
Steven Collins, author and archaeologist
Norman Geisler, author, theologian
Skip Heitzig, pastor and author
Joseph Holden, Current President & Co-Founder. Additionally serves as Senior Pastor of Calvary Chapel Temecula Valley and Adjunct Faculty at Calvary Chapel Bible College
Daniel Janosik, Islamic Expert

External links 
 Official website

References 

Transnational Association of Christian Colleges and Schools
Education in Santa Ana, California
Universities and colleges in Orange County, California
Educational institutions established in 2008
Seminaries and theological colleges in California
2008 establishments in California